Ayres may refer to:

People
Ayres (surname)

Companies
 Ayres (sports company), a British sports equipment manufacturer
 L. S. Ayres, an Indiana department store founded in 1872
 Ayres Corp., a former US aircraft manufacturer
 Ayre and Sons, a department store chain in Newfoundland, Canada

Other uses
 Ayres Rock in South Australia, and named for a former Premier of South Australia
 Point of Ayre and the Ayres National Nature Reserve in the Isle of Man.
 Ayres, former name of Zama, Mississippi
 Ayres Natural Bridge Park, a formation along the Oregon Trail in the State of Wyoming
 Ayres (music)
 Ayres (album)

See also

 Ayre (disambiguation)
 Eyre (disambiguation)